Agecroft Bridge railway station was on the Manchester, Bolton and Bury Railway. It served the town of Pendlebury in Greater Manchester (then Lancashire) in England. It also served the former Manchester Racecourse and Agecroft area of the town.

History

Later that year, regular passenger services ceased, but the station remained open for meetings at Manchester Racecourse; it was renamed Agecroft at this time. Regular services resumed in October 1857, as did the original name. The station closed permanently in January 1861.

References

External links
Site of Agecroft Bridge Station on navigable 1948 O.S. map

Disused railway stations in Salford
Former Lancashire and Yorkshire Railway stations
Railway stations in Great Britain opened in 1838
Railway stations in Great Britain closed in 1838
Railway stations in Great Britain opened in 1857
Railway stations in Great Britain closed in 1861
1838 establishments in England
1861 disestablishments in England